Daniel M. Keem (born March 8, 1982), known online as Keemstar, is an American YouTuber, podcaster, and streamer. He is best known for being the host of the Internet popular culture news show DramaAlert.

Early life 
Keem was born on March 8, 1982, in Buffalo, New York. He has one brother and one sister. He is of predominantly Italian and Greek descent.

Career

History 
Keem's first appearance on YouTube was in a Halo 3 YouTube video from January 2009, where he was recorded trash talking through the online multiplayer voice chat. In September 2012, Keem began using the hashtag #DramaAlert on Twitter. In June 2014, after numerous terminations, he registered his current channel DramaAlert. Keem often offers his own opinions on subjects he reports on.

In 2010, Keem circulated a death hoax about Lindsay Lohan which trended worldwide on Twitter.

In July 2010, Keem became the most subscribed person on blogTV.

In November 2010, Keem was swatted, later likening the experience to a hostage situation.

In February 2011, Keem promoted FortressCraft, a game coming to Xbox Live. Keem contacted the Indie developer and made a deal with them, taking part-ownership of the game. It went on to sell 2 million copies.

In March 2011, Keem founded WebStar Records with Scott Kinmartin; the project was later abandoned.

In July 2011, Keem held a tournament alongside Alki David called the 'Billionaire's Challenge' in which contestants competed for prizes. During production of a second Billionaire’s Challenge, David stated an assisted suicide would be shown, which caused controversy and led to some YouTubers cancelling their participation. David later clarified it was a joke, while the second show went ahead.

In January 2012, Keem started a video game live streaming website LiveaRoo.

In June 2012, Keem and Call of Duty YouTuber ONLYUSEmeBLADE created the Bad Kid Show podcast.

In July 2012, Keem started the campaign #Dildos4Africa. His intention was to buy $75,000 worth of dildos to send them to Africa in an attempt to reduce overpopulation.

Planned retirement 
On October 25, 2021, Keem announced on Twitter his plan to retire from YouTube on March 8, 2022, the day of his 40th birthday and after 14 years of content creation. In his announcement video released one day later titled "Retired," he expressed his dissatisfaction with making videos on the platform, citing the effects of cancel culture along with changes to YouTube's algorithm and the website's community as factors for his decision. On November 12, 2021, Keem hired a new host, Willy Mac, and also rehired a former host, TyBlue.

On February 12, 2022, Keem announced that he had changed his mind and would not retire from DramaAlert, citing a lack of confidence in any permanent replacement and a new 3 year sponsorship deal struck with sports betting company MyBookie.

Conflicts and controversies 
In 2010, during an argument with a moderator named Alex on the website BattleCam.com, Keem encouraged his viewers to type "Alex is a stupid nigger" in the stream's chat; he later apologized for saying the word.

In January 2016, Keem posted a tweet directed at TotalBiscuit, a YouTuber who was diagnosed with terminal cancer, saying that he could not wait to report on his death. Keem later apologized for the tweet. TotalBiscuit died in May 2018.

In May 2016, YouTuber iDubbbz released a video exposé on YouTube about Keem. In the video, he accused Keem of threatening big YouTubers with negative coverage and promoting small channels or accusing them of hiding something. iDubbbz called Keem a "very rash decision maker" and showed clips of Keem saying what iDubbbz deemed to be regrettable. In response, Keem called the video "entertaining" and denied wanting to attack other YouTubers, saying he has "no problem booking guests or landing exclusive interviews". He also apologized for the comments and incidents he caused, but sarcastically justified saying "nigger" by using a genealogical DNA test to prove he was nine percent black.

In 2016, Keem falsely accused Runescape Twitch streamer Tony Winchester—known as RSGloryandGold—of being a pedophile, having confused him with John Phillips, a convicted sex offender who used Runescape to attract children for sex. Keemstar was later proven to be incorrect. Tony proved his identity, leading Keem to apologize, fire one of his editors, offer Tony $1000 (which was refused), and delete his videos related to the matter. Winchester later forgave Keemstar.

In January 2019, YouTuber Jake Paul accused Keem of body shaming Paul's then-girlfriend, Erika Costell, after Keem made a tweet comparing her body to Eugenia Cooney, a YouTuber with an eating disorder.

In June 2019, YouTuber Etika posted a video in the form of a suicide note titled "I'm sorry". Keem was among the people Etika spoke about, saying "Keemstar, I wish you the best, my nigga". Following Etika's suicide, Keem came under scrutiny, as he was blamed for Etika's death due to the interview he had with him a couple months prior, along with statements made in tweets prior to and following the interview. Keem argued that he was not to blame for Etika's death because he seemed fine privately and doctors believed he was stable. Keem later posted a screenshot of several texts allegedly sent by Etika's mother, which stated that he was not to blame for Etika's suicide and that he loved Keem and his show.

In May 2020, YouTuber Ethan Klein released a video exposé about Keem, with one of his claims being that he exploited Etika, who later died by suicide. This resulted in G Fuel ending their sponsorship with Keem.

In April 2021, in response to Jake Paul facing sexual assault allegations from TikTok user Justine Paradise, Keem posted on Twitter that there is no way to sexually assault someone orally, stating the victim had to choose to "open her mouth" as well as quoting "Is there really no way to get away? I just really don't believe this story at all."

Discography

Singles

Podcasts

References

Notes

External links 
 
 
 
 
 

1982 births
Living people
American people of Dutch descent
American people of German descent
American people of Italian descent
American YouTubers
English-language YouTube channels
Internet-related controversies
New York (state) Republicans
News YouTubers
People from Buffalo, New York
Twitch (service) streamers
YouTube channels launched in 2014
YouTube controversies